TruJet was an Indian regional airline based at Rajiv Gandhi International Airport in Hyderabad. The airline commenced operations in July 2015 and ceased all operations in February 2022.

History 
Turbo Megha Airways Private Limited was incorporated on March 14, 2013 with Ram Charan and Vankayalapati Umesh as promoters, with the backing of 20 investors. The company planned to operate ATR aircraft primarily aimed at pilgrims and middle class travellers to destinations like Tirupati. 
The airline obtained a No Objection Certificate from the Ministry of Civil Aviation on 21 July 2014.
In August 2014, the promoters initiated negotiations to sell a majority stake in the airline to Hyderabad-based Megha Engineering and Infrastructures Limited (MEIL) in order to fund their operations.
MEIL holds 90 per cent stake in the airline. TruJet has "temporarily" suspended its flight operations until further notice.

The airline adopted the brand name TruJet in February 2015.
TruJet received its air operator's certificate for regional operations from the Directorate General of Civil Aviation on 7 July 2015. The airline commenced operations on 12 July with a flight from its Hyderabad hub to Tirupati.
The airline's Air Operators Permit (AOP) was changed to the scheduled commuter operator (SCO) category by the DGCA in May 2017, allowing the carrier to operate flights to other regions of India under the government's UDAN Regional Connectivity Scheme.

From 12 July 2020, five out of seven ATR aircraft operated by TruJet were grounded by lessors due unpaid dues.

On 1 April 2021, Trujet announced that US firm Interups had purchased a 49% stake in the company. Laxmi Prasad, the chairman of Interups stated in an interview to the online business site Moneycontrol “We plan to expand services to the length and breadth of the country, overseas, and get into segments such as cargo, private charters, and helicopter ambulance services. We will be operating at full scale.”

Interups' new investment plan would involve the purchase of narrow body aircraft such as the Airbus A220 and the Embraer E-Series .

On 15 February 2022, TruJet ceased all operations owing to financial crisis.

In May 2022, it was announced the Nagpur-headquartered, We Indian Nationals Aviation Private Limited (Winair) had acquired a 79% stake in Trujet.

Destinations
As of June 2021, TruJet flies to the following destinations:

Fleet

As of July 2022, TruJet operates the following aircraft:

References

External links

 

Airlines of India
Companies based in Hyderabad, India
Airlines established in 2013
2013 establishments in Andhra Pradesh
Indian companies established in 2013